Sean Diddy Combs

Enyce ([NYC]) is an American hip hop fashion label owned by Sean Diddy Combs. The label was established in New York City in March 1996 by Evan Davis, Lando Felix and Tony Shellman. The co-founders had originally met while working for Seattle-based clothing brand International News. Liz Claiborne acquired the company in February 2004 for $114 million from Sports Brands International. In October 2008 Enyce was purchased by Sean Combs and the Sean John Enterprise for $20 million.

Many have mispronounced the brand name over the years. The pronunciation originates from the phonetic spelling of "NYC" (en-y-ce) but sounded out in an Italian fashion.  This was because the company started under Fila, an Italian-based company.  Employees asked how they would pronounce the word replied "en-ne-che", making it the "correct" way to say the brand.

Enyce specialises in old school clothing, with an emphasis on puffy jackets and jerseys with their logos on them. They also seem to have an official Instagram account, which is owned and operated by the companies CEO, Sean Diddy Combs. Its last post was made in the year 2016, and most of the account's posts seem to not relate to the actual clothing company at all.

Clothing lines
Enyce
Lady Houy

References

Clothing companies of the United States
Hip hop fashion
ENYCE